The Dokkum class was a ship class of eightteen minesweepers that were built in the Netherlands for the Royal Netherlands Navy. They were paid for by the United States under the Mutual Defense Assistance Program (MDAP).

Design 
The minesweepers of the Dokkum- class were designed by the Dutch engineer Scheltema de Heere and based on the standard requirements laid down by the Western Union (WU), later known as Western European Union (WEU). Since the minesweepers of both the Dokkum and Wildervank-class are based on WU requirements, they are sometimes referred to in Dutch as WU-class minesweepers or minesweepers of the Western Union type.

The ships of the Dokkum-class were made mostly from wood, only the frame and superstructure was made from aluminium. It also had a double hull, with the inner hull made out of mahogany and the outer hull of teak. Furthermore, they were equipped with reversible propellers.

While the minesweepers of the Dokkum and Wildervank-class are almost identical, they do differ when it comes to the engines. The Dokkum-class was equipped with two MAN diesel engines and the Wildervank-class with two Werkspoor engines. As a result the minesweepers of the Dokkum-class were more durable than those of the Wildervank-class.

When it came to sweeping mines the ships of the Dokkum-class were equipped with several different sweepers. As mechanic sweeper it had the Wire Mk 3 mod 2, the magnetic sweeper consisted of the ML Mk 4 and later the Mb 5, and the acoustic sweepers consisted of the AX Mk 4v, AXx Mk 6B and AX Mk 3. Furthermore, the ships were equipped with two 40 mm guns.

Conversion to minehunter 
To keep in line with NATO requirements it was decided in 1962 to rebuild four Dokkum-class minesweepers (Dokkum, Drunen, Staphorst and Veere) into minehunters. During the rebuilding the ships were equipped with a Plessey 193 minehunting system, the bridge was modified to better suit mine hunting operations, an automatic track and trace system and autopilot were installed and several other modifications were implemented. The four minehunters of the Dokkum-class entered service of the Royal Netherlands Navy between 1968 and 1969.

Ships in class 
The ships were named after the smaller Dutch municipalities.

 ¹ = later rebuild as minehunter
 ² = later rebuild as diving support vessel

Export 
In 1994 the Abcoude was sold for 450.000 Dutch guilders to Peru. In addition, the reserve parts of the ship were sold for 160.000 Dutch guilders.

Notes

Citations

References

Mine warfare vessel classes
Minesweepers of the Royal Netherlands Navy